Malinovka is a rural locality (a selo) and the administrative center of Malinovsky Selsoviet of Aleysky District, Altai Krai, Russia. The population was 262 as of 2016. There are 6 streets.

Geography 
Malinovka is located 47 km west of Aleysk (the district's administrative centre) by road. Bobrovka is the nearest rural locality.

Ethnicity 
The village is inhabited by Russians and others.

References 

Rural localities in Aleysky District